Włodzimierz Kryszewski (20 March 1923 – 3 December 2004) was a Polish historian and encyclopedist. He was born in Toruń, Poland.

During the Second World War Kryszewski was member of Armia Krajowa. From 1942 until 1945 prisoner of several German concentration camps, among others of Auschwitz.

Works
 Pojęcia typologiczne w naukach humanistycznych ("Ruch Filozoficzny"" 1950)
 Teoria typów idealnych M. Webera jako narzêdzie badañ humanistycznych ("Ruch Filozoficzny"" 1951)
 Encyklopedie uniwersalne w krajach socjalistycznych - problemy naukowe... ("Przegląd Humanistyczny" 1983 nr 12)

References

1923 births
2004 deaths
People from Toruń
Polish resistance members of World War II
20th-century Polish historians
Polish male non-fiction writers
Auschwitz concentration camp survivors